Lembu Amiluhur Priyawardhana Priyono (23 October 1939 – 6 June 2001), generally referred to as Ami Prijono (Perfected Spelling: Ami Priyono) was an Indonesian film director and actor. He was married to the feminist writer Julia Suryakusuma.

Biography
Born in Batavia (now Jakarta) on 23 October 1939, Ami was the only child of Priyono, a politician-cum-educator who later became Minister of Education and Culture, and his wife Iwanah. After graduating from senior high school Ami left for Moscow, where he studied cinema at the All-Union State Institute of Cinematography.

After returning to Indonesia Ami began teaching at the National Theatre Academy in Jakarta. In 1968 he joined the domestic film industry, taking the role of artistic director in Djampang Mentjari Naga Hitam (Djampang Seeks the Black Dragon). He made his acting debut two years later in Tuan Tanah Kedawung as a supporting actor. In 1974 he married feminist writer Julia Suryakusuma.

At the 1974 Indonesian Film Festival Ami's artistic direction in Ambisi (Ambition) garnered him a Citra Award. That year he made his directorial debut with Dewi. His other film directed that year, Karmila, was adapted from the novel of the same name by Marga T. The film – the second most lucrative Indonesian movie of the year – is credited with generating interest in film adaptations over the following decade. He went on to become one of four directors to dominate the local film industry in the 1970s. After Lonceng Maut (Bell of Doom) in 1976 Ami abandoned artistic direction, focusing on his acting and directing.

In 1977 Ami released Jakarta Jakarta. Focusing on the miserable daily lives of the capital's inhabitants, the film won five Citra Awards at the 1978 Indonesian Film Festival in Ujungpandang, including Best Film, Best Director, and Best Screenplay (shared with N. Riantiarno). In 2009 Ben Murtaugh of SOAS, University of London, described the film as "a fascinating portrayal of [Jakarta] during the 1970s".

Ami's Roro Mendut, released in 1982, gave him his greatest international recognition. The film, which was based on an Indonesian legend and written by Y. B. Mangunwijaya, garnered him another Best Director nomination at the 1983 Indonesian Film Festival; he lost to Teguh Karya, director of Di Balik Kelambu. Ami received another nomination the following year for Yang, but lost to Sjumandjaja of Budak Nafsu. He directed his final film, Jodoh Boleh Diatur (Love can be Arranged), in 1988.

With the number of domestic film productions decreasing in the early 1990s, Ami left the cinema and began directing and acting for television, beginning with Salah Asuhan (Wrong Upbringing; 1994; as director) and Pedang Keadilan (Sword of Justice; 1996). During this period he served on the juries of several film festivals, including the Indonesian Serial Festival (Festival Sinetron Indonesia, 1994 and 1996), the Asia Pacific Film Festival (1995), and the Fukuoka International Film Festival (1996). He died on 6 June 2001, after several years of ill health.

Filmography
Ami acted in 34 films and was a crew member in 22. He directed twelve movies.

Cast

Tuan Tanah Kedawung (1970)
Beranak dalam Kubur (1971)
Mama (1972)
Si Bongkok (1972)
Anjing-Anjing Geladak (1972)
Laki-Laki Pilihan (1973)
Ita Si Anak Pungut (Nobody's Child) (1973)
Romi dan Juli (1974)
Christina (1977)
Ombaknya Laut Mabuknya Cinta (1978)
Kasus (Kegagalan Cinta) (1978)
Roda-Roda Gila (1978)
Ali Topan Detektif Partikelir Turun ke Jalan (1979)
Bayang-bayang Kelabu (1979)
Kabut Sutra Ungu (1979)
Hati Selembut Salju (Garis-garis Cakrawala) (1981)
Gundala Putra Petir (1981)
Remang-remang Jakarta (1981)

Untukmu Kuserahkan Segalanya (1984)
Yang Masih di Bawah Umur (1985)
Kidung Cinta (1985)
Keluarga Markum (1986)
Bintang Kejora (1986)
Cas Cis Cus (Sonata di Tengah Kota) (1989)
Kipas-kipas Cari Angin (1989)
Pengantin (1990)
Sejak Cinta Diciptakan (1990)
Oom Pasikom (Parodi Ibukota) (1990)
Boneka dari Indiana (1990)
Olga dan Sepatu Roda (1991)
Pengantin Remaja (1991)
Selembut Wajah Anggun (1992)
Ramadhan dan Ramona (1992)
Badut-badut Kota (1993)
Sesal (1994)

Crew

Djampang Mentjari Naga Hitam (1968) – as artistic director
Apa jang Kau Tjari, Palupi? (1969) – as artistic director
Lewat Tengah Malam (1971) – as artistic director
Jang Djatuh Dikaki Lelaki (1971) – as artistic director
Matinja Seorang Bidadari (1971) – as artistic director
Anjing-Anjing Geladak (1972) – as artistic director
Laki-Laki Pilihan (1973) – as artistic director
Ambisi (1973) – as artistic director
Ita Si Anak Pungut (Nobody's Child) (1973) – as artistic director
Dewi (1974) – as director
Karmila (1974) – as director
Semalam di Malaysia (1975) – as artistic director

Lonceng Maut (1976) – as artistic director
Kampus Biru (1976) – as director and scriptwriter
Kenangan Desember (1976) – as director
Jakarta Jakarta (1977) – as director, scriptwriter, and story writer
Dr Siti Pertiwi Kembali ke Desa (1979) – as director
Untukmu Indonesiaku (1980) – as director
Bukan Impian Semusim (1981) – as director
Roro Mendut (1982) – as director
Yang (1983) – as director
Pertunangan (1985) – as director
Jodoh Boleh Diatur (1988) – as director

References

Works cited

External links

1939 births
2001 deaths
Indonesian film directors
Indonesian male actors
Citra Award winners
Indonesian expatriates in the Soviet Union
Gerasimov Institute of Cinematography alumni